Michael John Hulligan (28 February 1923 – 12 September 1978) was an English footballer. In a seven-year career in the Football League with Port Vale, he made 209 league and cup appearances and scored 23 goals. He helped the club to win the Third Division North title in 1953–54.

Career
Hulligan played for Liverpool before he and Stan Palk joined Port Vale in July 1948 for what was, at the time, a club record combined transfer fee of £10,000. He impressed manager Gordon Hodgson, who subsequently sold wing rival Walter Keeley. He scored his first senior goal on 23 August 1948, in a 3–0 win over Reading at The Old Recreation Ground. However, he broke his ankle the following month, causing him to miss much of the season. He nevertheless hit five goals in 28 Third Division South games in 1948–49. He scored twice in 42 appearances in 1949–50, and was an ever-present for the 50 game 1950–51 season – the first to be played at the newly built Vale Park.

Hulligan scored four goals in 38 games in 1951–52 and four goals in 45 games in 1952–53, as he was a key part of Freddie Steele's squad that finished second in the Third Division North. However, he lost his first team place however in August 1953, and played just five league games of the club's highly successful 1953–54 campaign, missing out on the "Valiants" run to the FA Cup semi-finals. He featured just once in the Second Division in 1954–55, and was transferred to non-league side Northwich Victoria in July 1955.

Career statistics
Source:

Honours
Port Vale
Football League Third Division North: 1953–54

References

Footballers from Liverpool
English footballers
Association football midfielders
Liverpool F.C. players
Port Vale F.C. players
Northwich Victoria F.C. players
English Football League players
1923 births
1978 deaths